Whatcha Want is the fifth studio album by Finnish glam rock singer Michael Monroe, released on January 21, 2003, through the German label SPV GmbH.

It was Monroe's first solo album since Hanoi Rocks' reunion in 2001, and was released just two months after Hanoi Rocks' comeback album Twelve Shots on the Rocks. A song Monroe has originally written for this album, entitled "Whatcha Want" (which also inspired the album's name) was eventually used for the Hanoi Rocks album Twelve Shots on the Rocks.

Track listing

Personnel
Michael Monroe - vocals, guitar, additional bass, piano, saxophone, harmonica, handclaps
Timpa Laine - bass
Pink Gibson - lead guitar, rhythm guitar, 12-string guitar, acoustic guitar, backing vocals
Mr. T - keyboards
Lacu Lahtinen - drums
Dave Lindholm - lead guitar on "Telephone Bill is All Mine"
Maria Hänninen - backing vocals on "Jimmy Brown"

Michael Monroe albums
2003 albums